Elmar Sabir oglu Huseynov (17 July 1967 – 2 March 2005) was an independent Azerbaijani journalist, widely known for his criticism of Azerbaijani authorities, especially incumbent president Ilham Aliyev and his father and predecessor Heydar Aliyev.

He was murdered in March 2005, and it is believed that his murder was ordered by government officials.

Life 
Elmar Huseynov was born in 1967 in Baku and educated as an engineer at the Azerbaijan University of Architecture and Construction.

He began his journalistic career in the 1990s, first writing in a Russian daily newspaper in Azerbaijan titled Zerkalo and then as the editor-in-chief of a weekly called Alver. In 1996, he created a press agency called Trend and Monitor. In 1998 he was convicted for "insulting the nation" and being unable to pay the fine, was forced to close the Monitor. In August 1998, he opened the Baku boulevard. In November 1999, he also published the weekly Baku news, which was closed after eight editions. In February 2000, he became the editor of the Weekly monitor. The Baku boulevard was closed on September 4 by court order. Huseynov received many awards for his journalism. During his career, he received many threats and was subjected to harassment by authorities ranging up to incarceration.

He was murdered in Baku on 2 March 2005.

See also 
Khadija Ismayilova
Eynulla Fatullayev
 List of journalists killed in Europe

References

External links
 Profile on BBC
Investigators arrest chief murder suspect: IFEX
Eurovision: Former home of Elmar Huseynov BBC4,
Elmar Huseynov Committee to Protect Journalists
Second Anniversary of Elmar Huseynov’s Murder Shahla Ismailova, HRH Baku, June 5, 2007
 FBI Case File Shows How Azerbaijan Botched Investigation Into Journalist’s Death Eleanor Rose, 4 March 2021 

1967 births
2005 deaths
Journalists from Baku
Azerbaijani murder victims
Assassinated Azerbaijani journalists
Azerbaijan University of Architecture and Construction alumni
20th-century journalists